The year 1849 in architecture involved some significant events.

Buildings and structures

Buildings

 March 1 – Ashby railway station, Leicestershire, England, probably designed by Robert Chaplin, opened.
 May 1 – Stone railway station, Staffordshire, England, designed by H. A. Hunt, opened.
 September 2 – Gare de l'Est railway station in Paris (France), designed by François Duquesnay, opened.
 October 30 – London Coal Exchange opened.
 December 1 – Gothenburg City Hall (Sweden), designed by Pehr Johan Ekman, opened.
 Church of the Immaculate Conception, Farm Street, central London, designed by Joseph John Scoles, completed.
 All Saints, Ennismore Gardens, south London, designed by Lewis Vulliamy, interior completed.
 Boston Custom House (Massachusetts), designed by Ammi B. Young, completed.
 Rich-Twinn Octagon House, Akron, New York, built.

Events
 March – The Journal of Design and Manufactures is established by Henry Cole.
 May – The Seven Lamps of Architecture by John Ruskin is published.

Awards
 RIBA Royal Gold Medal – Luigi Canina.
 Grand Prix de Rome, architecture – Denis Lebouteux.

Births
 January 9 – Gaetano Koch, Italian architect (died 1910)
 February 22 – Carl Holzmann, Austrian architect (died 1914)
 May 22 – Aston Webb, English architect (died 1930)
 August 29 – John Sulman, English-born Australian architect (died 1934)

Deaths
 April 18 – Carlo Rossi, Neapolitan-born architect working in Saint Petersburg (born 1775)
 September – Daniel Robertson, American-born architect and garden designer working in Oxford and Ireland (born c. 1770)
 Robert Cary Long, Jr., American architect working in Baltimore (born 1810)
 John Pinch the younger, English architect working in Bath (born 1796)

References

Architecture
Years in architecture
19th-century architecture